Marcel Boulad (Arabic: مارسيل بولاد) (1 March 1905 – 5 April 1977) was an Egyptian fencer. He competed in the individual and team épée events at the 1936 Summer Olympics.

References

External links
 

1905 births
1977 deaths
Egyptian male épée fencers
Olympic fencers of Egypt
Fencers at the 1936 Summer Olympics
Sportspeople from Cairo
20th-century Egyptian people